Baileyboro is an unincorporated community in Bailey County, in the U.S. state of Texas. According to the Handbook of Texas, the community had a population of 61 in 1980.

History
Baileyboro was first settled sometime before 1900. It had three stores and 100 residents in 1940. It went down to 61 in 1980.

Geography
Baileyboro is located along Farm to Market Road 298 in south-central Bailey County. The Muleshoe National Wildlife Refuge is located southwest of the community.

Climate
According to the Köppen Climate Classification system, Baileyboro has a semi-arid climate, abbreviated "BSk" on climate maps.

Education
Baileyboro had a school in 1921 and 1940. Today, the community is served by the Muleshoe Independent School District.

References

Unincorporated communities in Bailey County, Texas
Unincorporated communities in Texas